Cimi (also, Dzhimi) is a village and municipality in the Quba Rayon of Azerbaijan.  It has a population of 1,082.

References 

Populated places in Quba District (Azerbaijan)